FSP may refer to:

Government 
 Florence State Prison, in Arizona, United States
 Florida State Prison, in the United States
 Folsom State Prison, in California, United States
 Food Stamp Program, a program of the United States Department of Agriculture
 Foreign Service of Pakistan
 Freeway service patrol, in the United States

Medicine 
 Familial spastic paraparesis
 Fibrin split products

Politics 
 Foro de São Paulo, a Latin American political assembly
 Freedom Socialist Party, a political party in the United States
 Freelance Solidarity Project, a US media-worker union division
 Free Socialist Party/Marxist-Leninists, a defunct political party in West Germany
 Free State Project, an American political migration
 Frontline Socialist Party, a political party in Sri Lanka

Technology 
 Fibre saturation point
 Fission Surface Power, a lunar colonization research project
 Finite State Process, the notation used to specify the behavior of concurrent systems
 Friction stir processing
 FSP Group, a Taiwanese electronics manufacturer
 Firmware Support Package, a firmware initialisation and management infrastructure by Intel
 File Service Protocol

Transport 
 Fateh Singhpura railway station, in Rajasthan, India
 Frankfurt Stadion station, in Germany
 Nikolai Airport, in Alaska, United States
 Saint-Pierre Airport, in  Saint-Pierre and Miquelon, France
 Shenton Park railway station, in Western Australia

Other uses
 Daughters of St. Paul, a Catholic religious congregation
 Factory Specification Parts
 Folha de S.Paulo, a Brazilian newspaper
 Food Service Provider
 Food self-provisioning
 French Saddle Pony
 Functional sentence perspective
 Full Scope Poly (List of U.S. security clearance terms)